Papyrus Oxyrhynchus 19 (P. Oxy. 19) is a fragment of the first book of the Histories of Herodotus (chapter 76), written in Greek. It was discovered by Grenfell and Hunt in 1897 in Oxyrhynchus. The fragment is dated to the second or third century. It is housed in Princeton University Library (Curator of Manuscripts). The text was published by Grenfell and Hunt in 1898.

The manuscript was written on papyrus in a roll. The fragment is 125 by 80 mm and contains 16 lines of text. The text is written in small square uncial script.

See also 
 Oxyrhynchus Papyri
 Papyrus Oxyrhynchus 18
 Papyrus Oxyrhynchus 20

References 

019
2nd-century manuscripts
3rd-century manuscripts
Herodotus